West Leyden High School is a high school in Northlake, Illinois. First opened for enrollment in 1959, the athletic mascot of West Leyden High School was originally the Knights until 1981. At this time, the East and West Leyden High School athletic programs merged to create an athletic team currently known as the Eagles.

Together with East Leyden High School in Franklin Park, Illinois, it comprises Leyden High School District 212 of the suburban communities in Franklin Park, Northlake, Rosemont, Schiller Park, River Grove, Melrose Park and unincorporated Leyden Township.

In September 2019, threats of shooting were made on social media. This led to East Leyden High School and West Leyden High School having classes online for a  day. Further, at least one child was forced to undergo a 72 hour hold after the school stalked multiple student's social media accounts. The parents of these students were not notified, and all Power of Attorney was illegally moved to the state during this time.

Academics
West Leyden's class of 2008 had a below average composite ACT score of  points below the state average.   West Leyden did not make Adequate Yearly Progress on the Prairie State Achievements Examination, which with the ACT comprises the state assessments used to fulfill the federal No Child Left Behind Act.  Overall, the school did not achieve AYP in reading or mathematics, while two of its three student subgroups failed to meet expectations in mathematics.

Student life

Athletics

Since 1981, West Leyden and East Leyden have a combined athletics program.  Prior to the schools unifying into a single program, West Leyden's teams were stylized as the Knights, and the school colors were blue and gold.  While East Leyden's team nickname of "Eagles" was retained for the combined program, West Leyden's colors became the colors for the unified program.

As a separate team, the only team to finish in the top four of their respective Illinois High School Association (IHSA) was the 1968—69 wrestling team.

In 2014, 15-year-old student Brody Roybal won the gold medal with the American team in the 2014 Winter Paralympics. He acquired a gold medal again at the 2018 Winter Paralympics, this time as a 19-year-old.

Activities

School Activities Include:

Art Club
The "L" Club (Athletic Organization)
The Lancer (Student Literary Magazine)
Chess Club
Class Boards
International Club
Key Club
Students Helping Achieve Racial Equality Club
Marching Eagles (Marching Band)
International Thespian Society (Speech Team/Theater)

Math Team
Model UN
Scholastic Bowl
Science Club
Snowball
Student Council
Video Game Club
SADD - Students Against Destructive Decisions

Fine Arts
The Leyden Fine Arts program is composed of music, art and theatrical performance. Various music groups, ranging from choral groups to instrumental orchestras, have excelled in multiple regional, state and national competitions. Choral participants have consistently been top performers in the Illinois Music Educators Association (IMEA) competitions, both in the Jazz and Classical divisions. The Marching Band has also travelled to various locations throughout the United States, including Pennsylvania, Florida, among other locations. Student performers have also been participants of the Illinois High School Theater Association's (IHSTA's), annual TheaterFest. Students throughout the state compete for roles in the annual performance of a classical musical or drama production. The Speech and Performance Team is also a competitive group which has continued to develop and fine-tune their Forensics Speaking abilities throughout the years, with various events in Dramatic and Humorous Interpretation, Radio Speaking, Poetry Reading, and Oratorical Declamation.

Notable people
 Tom Dore is a play-by-play announcer known for his long association with the Chicago Bulls (Dore attended West Leyden before transferring to and graduating from East Leyden).
 Manny Flores, Chicago City Council member from the 1st ward. He graduated from West Leyden.
 Tom Rooney, Republican member of the Illinois Senate. He has taught U.S. history at West Leyden for over twenty years.
 Frankie Sullivan is the lead guitarist in the band Survivor. Together with fellow Leyden alumni Rick Weigand they formed the band in 1978. He was nominated for an Academy Award in 1982, in the category Best Original Song for co-writing the song "Eye of the Tiger" from the film Rocky III.
 Mark Venturini was an actor who appeared in "Friday the 13th: A New Beginning," "Return of the Living Dead," and other films and television productions. He was a senior and quarterback for the West Leyden football team when he was tapped by drama coach Nancy Giovannoni to audition for the role of Hawkeye Pierce in the school's production of "M*A*S*H", which made him realize his talent and love for acting.

References

External links
 Leyden High School district website

Educational institutions established in 1959
Northlake, Illinois
Public high schools in Cook County, Illinois
1959 establishments in Illinois